The ATP Challenger Tour, in 2017, was the secondary men's professional tennis circuit organized by the ATP. The 2017 ATP Challenger Tour calendar comprises 155 tournaments, with prize money ranging from $50,000 up to $150,000. It was the 40th edition of the challenger tournaments cycle, and 9th under the name of Challenger Tour.

Schedule 
This is the complete schedule of events on the 2017 calendar, with player progression documented from the quarterfinals stage.

January

February

March

April

May

June

July

August

September

October

November

Statistical information 
These tables present the number of singles (S) and doubles (D) titles won by each player and each nation during the season. The players/nations are sorted by: 1) total number of titles (a doubles title won by two players representing the same nation counts as only one win for the nation); 2) a singles > doubles hierarchy; 3) alphabetical order (by family names for players).

To avoid confusion and double counting, these tables should be updated only after an event is completed.

Titles won by player

Titles won by nation

Point distribution 
Points are awarded as follows:

References

External links 
 Official website
 Calendar

 
ATP Challenger Tour
ATP Challenger Tour